Julian T. Pinder is a Canadian-born film director, producer, and writer originally from Dundas, Ontario. He created, directed and executive produced Fire Chasers, a four-part Netflix Original series with Leonardo DiCaprio, released in September 2017, and was nominated for the US Award for Social Justice at the Santa Barbara Film Festival in 2010.

Pinder founded Deliberate Films in 2007 and his titles include feature films, documentaries, television series, music videos, and commercial campaigns. His films have been released on HBO, Showtime, Netflix, and Amazon.

Jesus Town USA, his last feature documentary, a Sky Atlantic, Showtime, and Netflix feature was initially released in the UK, and was heralded as a "factual Napoleon Dynamite" in The Globe and Mail.

His first feature, LAND, which follows the darkly comedic trials of a group of American resort developers in Nicaragua at the time when Sandinista revolutionary Daniel Ortega swept back into power, premiered at the Hot Docs Film Festival in 2010 to four and five star reviews. It was nominated for Best Feature at the Santa Barbara Film Festival, and was labeled by one publication as "a goofier Joseph Conrad story seen through a Hunter S. Thompson haze". He went on to direct and produce three more feature documentaries which were released theatrically and on DVD through KinoSmith and Cargo Releasing.

His documentary Trouble In The Peace (2012) was distributed theatrically and provided part of the story line – including excerpts as part of a film within a film – for his 2016 feature film Population Zero, a mocumentary in which Pinder played a version of himself. Population Zero was screened successfully at the Newport Beach, Whistler, and Napa Valley film festivals to sold-out audiences.

Early in his career Pinder worked as a producer with Sarrazin Couture Entertainment overseeing numerous projects with Lifetime and CTV, and worked closely with Jennifer Baichwal and Nicholas de Pencier (Watermark, Manufactured Landscapes), and Helen Shaver (The Unit, Law and Order). During this period Pinder also directed a series of short art-house films in wartime Kosovo and Bosnia.

Apart from feature film and television, Pinder has also created commercial campaigns including Ralph Lauren RRL, MTV Rock the Vote spots, and music videos for Grammy-nominated band The Milk Carton Kids starring actress Amanda Seyfried, as well as short films for Blondie and The Raconteurs, among many others.

In his earlier years, Pinder opened a restaurant and jazz bar which became a well-known Toronto establishment in the arts scene and hosted, among other events, the Chet Baker Jazz Festival. He also founded one of the first "urban wineries", Vintage One Wines.

In 2019 he co-founded the Pioneertown International Film Festival, a boutique annual event held in the movie town built by Roy Rogers. The festival showcases competition and non-competition categories as well as a special series dedicated to restored iconic Western films in partnership with The Autry Museum of The American West and Paramount. The inaugural festival took place in 2022 with live shows by The Dandy Warhols and The Sons of The Pioneers, with an Opening Night premiere of Jason Momoa's Western The Last Manhunt. The festival also hosts events held by well-known actors, writers, directors, producers, cinematographers, with programmers from film festivals including Cannes and Sundance. 

Julian currently lives with his partner, artist Keely King, in the mountains outside of Pioneertown, California on his off-grid horse ranch.

"

Filmography

References

External links
 
 

People from Dundas, Ontario

1982 births
Living people
Film producers from Ontario
Canadian documentary film producers
Queen's University at Kingston alumni